The 1988 Green Bay Packers season was their 70th season overall and their 68th in the National Football League (NFL). Under coach Lindy Infante, the team finished with their second 4–12 in three seasons, and finishing last place in the NFC Central division. 1988 was the first season the Packers played under Infante.

Offseason

NFL draft

Personnel

Staff

Roster

Regular season

Schedule 

Note: Intra-division opponents are in bold text.

Game summaries

Week 1: vs. Los Angeles Rams

Week 2: vs. Tampa Bay Buccaneers

Week 3: at Miami Dolphins

Week 4: vs. Chicago Bears

Week 5: at Tampa Bay Buccaneers

Week 7: at Minnesota Vikings

Week 8: vs. Washington Redskins

Week 9: at Buffalo Bills

Week 10: at Atlanta Falcons

Week 12: vs. Detroit Lions

Week 13: at Chicago Bears

Week 14: at Detroit Lions

Week 15: vs. Minnesota Vikings

Week 16: at Phoenix Cardinals

Standings

References

External links 
 1988 Green Bay Packers at Pro-Football-Reference.com

Green Bay Packers seasons
Green Bay Packers
Green Bay